The Tai Fung Tong Art House is an arts center in São Lázaro, Macau, China.

History
The art house is located at Choi Lok Chi Mansion which was constructed in 1918 by Choi Lok Chi, the director of Kiang Wu Hospital and Macao Chamber of Commerce and the president of Macau Tung Sin Tong Charitable Society. The mansion once housed a catholic school.

See also
 List of tourist attractions in Macau

References

1918 establishments in Macau
Buildings and structures in Macau
Macau Peninsula